Wanderlust was Frankie Laine's 42nd  12" long-play album, recorded and originally released in 1963. It is organized loosely around the theme of freedom and travel, pertaining to the German word Wanderlust.

Track listing
"Love is Where You Find It"
"Serenade"
"Wagon Wheels"
"I Let Her Go"
"Misirlou"
"Riders in the Sky"
"De Glory Road"
"What Kind of Fool Am I"
"On the Road to Mandalay"
"If I Love Again"
"The Moment of Truth"
"I'm Gonna Live 'Til I Die"

References

External links
 The Frankie Laine Discography

Frankie Laine albums
1963 albums
Albums produced by Irving Townsend
Columbia Records albums
Concept albums